The Yahoo! User Interface Library (YUI) is a discontinued open-source JavaScript library for building richly interactive web applications using techniques such as Ajax, DHTML, and DOM scripting. YUI includes several core CSS resources. It is available under a BSD License.
Development on YUI began in 2005 and Yahoo! properties such as My Yahoo! and the Yahoo! front page began using YUI in the summer of that year. YUI was released for public use in February 2006. It was actively developed by a core team of Yahoo! engineers.

In September 2009, Yahoo! released YUI 3, a new version of YUI rebuilt from the ground up to modernize the library and incorporate lessons learned from YUI 2. Among the enhancements are a CSS selector driven engine, like jQuery, for retrieving DOM elements, a greater emphasis on granularity of modules, a smaller seed file that loads other modules when necessary, and a variety of syntactic changes intended to make writing code faster and easier.

The YUI Library project at Yahoo! was founded by Thomas Sha and sponsored internally by Yahoo! co-founder Jerry Yang; its principal architects have been Sha, Adam Moore, and Matt Sweeney. The library's developers maintain the YUIBlog; the YUI community discusses the library and its implementations in its community forum.

On August 29, 2014, it was announced that active development of YUI by Yahoo! would end, citing the evolution of the JavaScript standards, steadily decreasing interest in large JavaScript libraries by developers, and the proliferation of server-side solutions. Future development will be limited to maintenance releases addressing issues that are "absolutely critical to Yahoo properties."

Features
The YUI Library is fully documented on its website; detailed API documentation accompanies the library download. It has six types of components: YUI core, utilities, UI controls, CSS components, developer tools, and build tools.

Core
The YUI Core is a light (31KB minified) set of tools for event management and DOM manipulation.

YUI Global Object
 The YUI Global Object contains language utilities, a script loader, and other baseline infrastructure for YUI.
Dom Collection
 Helps with common DOM scripting tasks, including element positioning and CSS style management.
Event Utility
 Provides developers with easy and safe access to browser events (such as mouse clicks and key presses). It also provides the Custom Event object for publishing and subscribing to custom events.

Utilities
 Animation
 Helps create "effects" by animating the position, size, opacity or other characteristics of page elements.
 Browser History Manager
 Helps web applications use the browser's back button and bookmarking functionality.
 Connection Manager
 Helps manage XMLHttpRequest transactions in a cross-browser fashion. It has integrated support for form posts, error handling, callbacks and file uploading.
 Cookie
 Allows you to manage browser cookies and subcookies through a simple API.
 DataSource
 Provides a common configurable interface for other components to interact with different types of data, from simple JavaScript arrays to online servers over XHR.
 Drag and drop
 The YUI Drag and Drop Utility makes it easy to make elements "draggable" and to create drop targets that respond to drag events.
 Element
 Provides a wrapper for HTML elements in the DOM and makes simpler common tasks such as adding listeners, manipulating the DOM, and setting and getting attributes.
 Get
 The Get Utility supports the asynchronous loading of data and scripts through script nodes and the dynamic loading of external CSS files.
 ImageLoader
 YUI's ImageLoader allows you to defer the loading of images that are not visible in the viewport at the time the page loads.  This can result in big performance boosts.
 JSON
 The JSON Utility provides methods for validation of incoming JSON data to verify that it is safe and methods to convert JavaScript data to a JSON-formatted string.  These methods are based on Douglas Crockford's work at JSON.org.
 Resize
 Allows you to make any block-level HTML element resizable.
 Selector
 The YUI Selector Utility allows you to grab references to HTML elements via CSS3 selector syntax.
 YUI Loader
 YUI Loader is a client-side loader engine that can dynamically load any YUI component (and dependencies) on the fly.

Controls
 AutoComplete
 Provides autocomplete feature (suggestion lists and type-ahead functionality) for user interactions involving text-entry. It supports a variety of data-source formats. It also supports server-side data-sources via XMLHttpRequest.
 Button
 Enables the creation of rich, graphical buttons that function like traditional HTML form buttons.
 Calendar
 A graphical, dynamic control used for date selection.
 Charts
 The Charts Control retrieves data via the DataSource Utility and displays the data in a variety of common chart formats (line, bar, pie, etc.).
 Color Picker
 The Color Picker Control provides a rich visual interface for color selection.
 Container
 Supports a variety of DHTML windowing patterns including Tooltip, Panel, Dialog, SimpleDialog, Module and Overlay.
 DataTable
 Simple yet powerful API to display screen-reader accessible tabular data on a web page. Notable features include sortable columns, pagination, scrolling, row selection, resizable columns, and inline editing.
 ImageCropper
 ImageCropper provides the UI and interactive elements for a client-side image cropper.
 Layout Manager
 Allows you to create cross-browser, pixel perfect layouts with little effort by providing a fixed layout containing, top, bottom, left, right and center layout units.
 Menu
 Provides an easy API for creating fly-out menus, menu bars, and context menus.
 Rich Text Editor
 The YUI Rich Text Editor is a sophisticated client-side text-processor that is modular and highly configurable, suitable for any open-ended text-entry situation.
 Slider
 Provides a generic slider element that enables the user to choose within a finite range of values on one or two axes.
 TabView
 Provides navigable tabbed views of content; supports dynamic loading of tab content via XMLHttpRequest.
 TreeView
 Produces a content tree whose nodes can be expanded and contracted.
 Uploader
 Allows for multi-file file upload with feedback on upload progress.

CSS resources
 CSS Base
 Use Base after Reset to provide a consistent, cross-browser replacement for the standard browser CSS rules to which web developers are  accustomed.
 CSS Grids
 Seven basic page wireframes with subsection components to support over 1000 different page layouts.
 CSS Fonts
 Standardized cross-browser font families and size rendering.
 CSS Reset
 CSS declarations remove margins and standardize cross-browser rendering on common elements.

Developer tools
 Logger
 Provides a quick and easy way to write log messages to an on-screen console, the Firebug extension for Mozilla Firefox, or the Safari JavaScript console.
 Profiler
 A cross-browser, non-visual code profiler for JavaScript.
 ProfilerViewer
 Used in combination with Profiler to provide rich visualizations of your profiling data — both graphically (using the Charts Control) and in tabular format (using DataTable).
 YUI Test
 YUI Test is a testing framework for browser-based JavaScript solutions. Using YUI Test, you can easily add unit testing to your JavaScript solutions. While not a direct port from any specific xUnit framework, YUI Test does derive some characteristics from nUnit and JUnit.

Build tools
 YUI Compressor
 YUI Compressor is a tool that minifies JavaScript and CSS safely.
 YUIDoc
 YUIDoc is a tool written in JavaScript that generates searchable API documentation of JavaScript code. It is typically used as part of a build process. YUIDoc is comment-driven and is compatible with a variety of coding styles and programming languages.

See also

 Comparison of JavaScript frameworks
 CSS framework
 JavaScript framework
 JavaScript library

References

External links
 YUI Project Site and Issue Trackers
 YUI Public Source Code Repository
 Yahoo! User Interface Blog
 Yahoo! Design Patterns Library
 YUICoder.com - Manipulating the Yahoo! User Interface (covers old YUI 2.x)

Yahoo! software
JavaScript libraries
Ajax (programming)
CSS frameworks
Software using the BSD license